A King's Story is a 1965 British documentary film directed by Harry Booth about the life of King Edward VIII, from his birth until abdication in 1936. It was nominated for an Academy Award for Best Documentary Feature.

See also
 Orson Welles filmography

References

External links

1965 films
British documentary films
Films directed by Harry Booth
Documentary films about British royalty
1965 documentary films
Edward VIII
Cultural depictions of the Edward VIII abdication crisis
1960s English-language films
1960s British films